Sablicola is a fungal genus in the family Halosphaeriaceae. It is a monotypic genus, containing the single species Sablicola chinensis, described as new to science in 2004. This is a marine fungus that was collected from brackish water in the Pearl River Estuary in southern China. It features ascospores that have two polar and four equatorial, flattened, attenuate, strap-like appendages with parallel striations. These striations break down into fine threads when mounted in seawater.

References

Microascales
Fungi of China
Monotypic Sordariomycetes genera
Taxa described in 2004